Zvonko Kalezić (born 19 September 1957) is a Montenegrin retired football midfielder who played in several clubs in Yugoslav First and Second League.

Club career
Born in Jastreb, a location within the municipality of Danilovgrad, he started playing in 1976 in the first-team of Budućnost Titograd. However, after spending two seasons without debuting in the league, he decided to accept a loan deal to OFK Titograd where his younger brother Vasilije was plying. They helped the club achieve promotion to the Yugoslav Second League and both Kalezić brothers stayed further one season at OFK Titograd.

Zvonko returned to Budućnost at summer 1980 and made one appearance with them in the 1980–81 Yugoslav First League. During the winter-break he moved to NK Čelik Zenica playing in the Yugoslav Second League. He played at Zenica until 1984 having been part of the generation that helped the club achieve the promotion to the First League in 1982–83, and played with them in top-league in 1983–84.

In summer 1984 he joined second-level side FK Novi Pazar. In the following years he will have spells in a number of clubs in the Yugoslav Second League, chronologically, FK Radnički Niš, FK Trepča, FK Ivangrad, FK Rudar Pljubija and FK Borac Banja Luka, before finishing his career by playing in lower-league side FK Mornar.

References

External links
 
 

1957 births
Living people
People from Danilovgrad Municipality
Association football midfielders
Yugoslav footballers
FK Budućnost Podgorica players
OFK Titograd players
NK Čelik Zenica players
FK Novi Pazar players
FK Radnički Niš players
FK Trepča players
FK Berane players
FK Rudar Prijedor players
FK Borac Banja Luka players
FK Mornar players
Yugoslav First League players
Yugoslav Second League players